Reewa Rathod is an Indian singer, songwriter, pianist, and performing artist. She is best known for her songs Maula (One Above) and Saaya Tere Ishq Ka. She won the Mirchi Music Award for Best Independent Song of The Year 2019 for her debut single Maula (One Above) 2018.

Early life and education 
Reewa Rathod was born in Mumbai to singers Roop Kumar Rathod and Sunali Rathod. At the age of four, she sang the Meera bhajan Payoji Maine Ram Ratan Dhan Payo at the Tejpal Hall in Mumbai. Her grandfather, the Late Pandit Chaturbhuj Rathod, was a well known Dhrupad Dhamar vocalist of the Aditya Gharana of Jamnagar. Her paternal uncles Shravan Rathod and Vinod Rathod are well-known music composers and singers in the Indian film industry.

Reewa started learning music from her father Roop Kumar Rathod training in Hindustani, Carnatic and Western Classical. She continued studying piano under of Ms.Shanti Seldon and has passed all 8 grades of Western classical piano from the Associated Board Of the Royal Schools of Music London. She has studied Carnatic Classical from the Smt. BalaMani Aiyyar and Smt.Prasanna Warrior. She is currently studying under Padma Bhushan Pandits Rajan and Sajan Mishra of Benaras Gharana.

Career 
Reewa's first public performance was at the at age of 4 years at Tejpal Auditorium Mumbai for her Grandfather Late Pandit Chaturbhuj Rathod's 1st Death Anniversary. Her first public performance as an artist came as the opening act for a Bryan Adams concert in 2011 in Pune, where she sang "Crossing Limits", a self-penned song.

She performed at the Doon School's Rose Bowl in 2012 and Saptrang in 2014. She was awarded Sur Jytosna National Music Award.

Reewa's song "Enroute Ganesha" was selected for the 20th year compilation of ‘Budhha-Bar'. She has recorded several tracks with Dj Ravin (Buddha Bar) and is one of the first Indian artists to get her works published under the lounge music label Buddha Bar Paris.

She composed and recorded Tandaana for the Spanish film Rastres De Sandal (Traces of Sandalwood) starring Nandita Das and Aina Clotet.

Reewa’s debut single "Maula (One Above)" (2018) has surpassed over 2 million views on YouTube and has won the Pepsi Mirchi music award for Best Independent Song of The Year in 2019.

"Saanwal", the first track of her project "Travel with Masters" was released on 17 January 2019, produced by Ustad Zakir Hussain and Michael Mennart, featuring saxophonist Chris Potter. The song blended Indian Folk and Spanish sound together.

In 2020 she released her debut album Saaya Tere Ishq Ka which was composed by Reewa with lyrics by Gulzar. The title track "Maula (One Above)" was mixed and mastered by Brian Malouf.

Reewa has performed "Jasmine Flower" in Chinese, for Yue-sai Kan's live-streaming charity fashion gala 2020, alongside Kenny G, Lang Lang and three other prominent artists in the UK, Norway and France.

Critical reception
Reewa to put her skills on display - MID-DAY 

"Reewa is one of my brightest and youngest composers and I was glad to work on her debut single" - Gulzar - BUSINESS STANDARD

Reewa's debut solo - DNA

Introducing Reewa Rathod - AVS 

Tuneful Crooner - VERVE MAGAZINE 

1st solo album - Saaya Tere Ishq Ka -  INDIA TV NEWS

After her first single "Maula" in 2018 and "Saanwal" (with Zakir Hussain) in 2019, the young singer and composer is now coming up with her first solo album titled "Saaya Tere Ishq Ka" - HI INDIA 

Eyecatchers  - INDIA TODAY 

Making a niche - Reewa speaks exclusively with NAGPUR TODAY

References

External links

Living people
21st-century Indian women classical singers
Singers from Mumbai
Indian women singer-songwriters
Year of birth missing (living people)